Bangladesh–New Zealand relations refer to the bilateral relations between Bangladesh and New Zealand.

Diplomatic relations 

Bangladesh and New Zealand do not share direct diplomatic relationship with each other. Embassy  of New Zealand to  India  in New Delhi is dual accredited to Bangladesh while embassy of Bangladesh to Australia in Canberra is dual accredited to  New Zealand.

High level visits 
Former Health Minister of Bangladesh, Dr Ruhal Haque paid an official visit to Wellington in August 2009. In 2014, special envoy to the Prime Minister of New Zealand, Sir Jim Bolger paid an official four-day visit to Dhaka.

Educational cooperation 
Bangladesh and New Zealand have been cooperating each other in the education sector. Every year a number of Bangladeshi undergraduate and graduate students are granted scholarships to study in New Zealand.

Economic cooperation 
Bilateral trade between Bangladesh and New Zealand has been growing steadily. New Zealand has become one of the new markets for the Bangladeshi shipbuilding industry when the Government of New Zealand signed a deal with Western Marine Shipyard in 2013 to build an oceangoing vessel that would operate between Tokelau and Samoa Islands. When built, it would be the first Bangladeshi-made ship for the Pacific. The deal, however, raised some controversies as the New Zealand government chose a foreign firm over the local shipyards. Other Bangladeshi exports to New Zealand include woven and woolen garments, jute products etc. The bilateral trade is largely on New Zealand's favor. In 2011, the bilateral trade between the two countries amounted to almost US$200 million, of which, a little over $150 million were New Zealand's export to Bangladesh. New Zealand's export items are largely dominated by dairy products.

References 

 
New Zealand
Bilateral relations of New Zealand